Ray or Raymond Baker may refer to:

Ray Stannard Baker (1870–1946), American journalist and author
Ray Baker (record producer), country-western music producer
Ray Baker (actor) (born 1948), American actor
Ray Jerome Baker (1880–1972), American photographer, film maker and lecturer
Raymond T. Baker (1877–1935), Director of the U.S. Mint 1917–22
Raymond W. Baker (born 1935), American businessman, scholar and author
Raymond Baker (chemist) (born 1936), former CEO of the BBSRC
Raymond Baker (cricketer) (born 1954), English cricketer
Ora Ray Baker (aka Ameena Begum), wife of Sufi mystic Inayat Khan (1882–1927)
Ray Baker, divorced spouse of American actress Patricia Richardson
R. Stan Baker (born 1977), American federal judge